Autódromo is a train station on ViaMobilidade Line 9-Emerald, in the district of Cidade Dutra in São Paulo,  away from Autódromo José Carlos Pace.

History
The station was built by CPTM to attend Interlagos Circuit and adjacencies. Opened on 17 October 2007, the station was the first of integrated operation between CPTM and Metro. It is also the first to be delivered to transform CPTM lined in surface metro, which consists in less wait time in the platform and more comfort in the trains, among other aspects.

Autódromo station is also close to the entrance of Pinheiros River Bicycle Path, accessed through Vitorino Goulart da Silva Bridge.

See also
 Cidade Dutra
 Line 9 (CPTM)
 Subprefecture of Capela do Socorro
 Roman Catholic Diocese of Santo Amaro
 Interlagos Racetrack

References

External links
 Official page of the Paulista Metropolitan Trains Company
 Subprefecture of Capela do Socorro
 Roman Catholic Diocese of Santo Amaro
 Interlagos Racetrack

Railway stations opened in 2007